Haile is a civil parish in the Borough of Copeland, Cumbria, England.  It contains nine listed buildings that are recorded in the National Heritage List for England.  Of these, two are listed at Grade II*, the middle of the three grades, and the others are at Grade II, the lowest grade.  The parish includes the village of Haile, and is otherwise rural,  The listed buildings comprise a country house and its gatehouse range, smaller houses, a barn, a church, and three milestones.


Key

Buildings

References

Citations

Sources

Lists of listed buildings in Cumbria